Screening is a defensive tactic in which a picket or outposts are used to hide the nature and strength of a military force; provide early warning of enemy approach; impede and harass the enemy main body with indirect fire; and report on the activity of the enemy main body. Screening forces may conduct patrols, establish outposts, and help destroy enemy reconnaissance units.

A screening mission seeks to deny enemy reconnaissance units close-in observation of the main body. An effective screen can conceal where an army begins and ends, making it hard to flank. In modern warfare, screening is performed by armoured cars and light tanks.

Screening force
Screening is often done by reconnaissance units such as cavalry, which operate within range of supporting artillery. In contrast to a guard force, a screening force may consist of a scout platoon rather than a task force or squadron; and its mission is less ambitious, focusing on early warning to the main body rather than preventing enemy observation and direct fire on the main body. Also, unlike a guard force, a screening force is deployed over an extended area, to the rear and flanks of the main force, rather than to the front. The screening force's minimal tasks enable it to have a wide frontage. The screen line describes the trace along which the protecting unit is providing security. Aerial assets are used when ground assets cannot keep pace with the main body.

A screening force normally uses direct fire only for self-defense and does not seek to become decisively engaged with enemy forces.

Examples

During the American Civil War, at Gettysburg, Pennsylvania, Maj. Gen. John Buford set the conditions for Maj. Gen. George Meade's success by ensuring the Army of the Potomac occupied the high ground, which destroyed General Robert E. Lee's army when it attacked.

See also
Covering force

References

Force protection tactics